In pharmacology, bioavailability is a subcategory of absorption and is the fraction (%) of an administered drug that reaches the systemic circulation.

By definition, when a medication is administered intravenously, its bioavailability is 100%. However, when a medication is administered via routes other than intravenous, its bioavailability is generally lower than that of intravenous due to intestinal endothelium absorption and first-pass metabolism. Thereby, mathematically, bioavailability equals the ratio of comparing the area under the plasma drug concentration curve versus time (AUC) for the extravascular formulation to the AUC for the intravascular formulation. AUC is used because AUC is proportional to the dose that has entered the systemic circulation.

Bioavailability of a drug is an average value; to take population variability into account, deviation range is shown as ±. To ensure that the drug taker who has poor absorption is dosed appropriately, the bottom value of the deviation range is employed to represent real bioavailability and to calculate the drug dose needed for the drug taker to achieve systemic concentrations similar to the intravenous formulation. To dose without knowing the drug taker's absorption rate, the bottom value of the deviation range is used in order to ensure the intended efficacy, unless the drug is associated with a narrow therapeutic window.

For dietary supplements, herbs and other nutrients in which the route of administration is nearly always oral, bioavailability generally designates simply the quantity or fraction of the ingested dose that is absorbed.

Definitions

In pharmacology 

Bioavailability is a term used to describe the percentage of an administered dose of a xenobiotic that reaches the systemic circulation.
It is denoted by the letter f (or, if expressed in percent, by F).

In nutritional science 

In nutritional science, which covers the intake of nutrients and non-drug dietary ingredients, the concept of bioavailability lacks the well-defined standards associated with the pharmaceutical industry. The pharmacological definition cannot apply to these substances because utilization and absorption is a function of the nutritional status and physiological state of the subject, resulting in even greater differences from individual to individual (inter-individual variation). Therefore, bioavailability for dietary supplements can be defined as the proportion of the administered substance capable of being absorbed and available for use or storage.

In both pharmacology and nutrition sciences, bioavailability is measured by calculating the area under curve (AUC) of the drug concentration time profile.

In environmental sciences or science

Bioavailability is the measure by which various substances in the environment may enter into living organisms.  It is commonly a limiting factor in the production of crops (due to solubility limitation or absorption of plant nutrients to soil colloids) and in the removal of toxic substances from the food chain by microorganisms (due to sorption to or partitioning of otherwise degradable substances into inaccessible phases in the environment). A noteworthy example for agriculture is plant phosphorus deficiency induced by precipitation with iron and aluminum phosphates at low soil pH and precipitation with calcium phosphates at high soil pH. Toxic materials in soil, such as lead from paint may be rendered unavailable to animals ingesting contaminated soil by supplying phosphorus fertilizers in excess. Organic pollutants such as solvents or pesticides  may be rendered unavailable to microorganisms and thus persist in the environment when they are adsorbed to soil minerals or partition into hydrophobic organic matter.

Absolute bioavailability 

Absolute bioavailability compares the bioavailability of the active drug in systemic circulation following non-intravenous administration (i.e., after oral, buccal, ocular, nasal, rectal, transdermal, subcutaneous, or sublingual administration), with the bioavailability of the same drug following intravenous administration. It is the fraction of the drug absorbed through non-intravenous administration compared with the corresponding intravenous administration of the same drug. The comparison must be dose normalized (e.g., account for different doses or varying weights of the subjects); consequently, the amount absorbed is corrected by dividing the corresponding dose administered.

In pharmacology, in order to determine absolute bioavailability of a drug, a pharmacokinetic study must be done to obtain a plasma drug concentration vs time plot for the drug after both intravenous (iv) and extravascular (non-intravenous, i.e., oral) administration. The absolute bioavailability is the dose-corrected area under curve (AUC) non-intravenous divided by AUC intravenous. The formula for calculating the absolute bioavailability, F, of a drug administered orally (po) is given below (where D is dose administered).

 

Therefore, a drug given by the intravenous route will have an absolute bioavailability of 100% (f = 1), whereas drugs given by other routes usually have an absolute bioavailability of less than one.
If we compare the two different dosage forms having same active ingredients and compare the two drug bioavailability is called comparative bioavailability.

Although knowing the true extent of systemic absorption (referred to as absolute bioavailability) is clearly useful, in practice it is not determined as frequently as one may think. The reason for this is that its assessment requires an intravenous reference; that is, a route of administration that guarantees all of the administered drug reaches systemic circulation. Such studies come at considerable cost, not least of which is the necessity to conduct preclinical toxicity tests to ensure adequate safety, as well as potential problems due to solubility limitations. These limitations may be overcome, however, by administering a very low dose (typically a few micrograms) of an isotopically labelled drug concomitantly with a therapeutic non-isotopically labelled oral dose (the isotopically-labelled intravenous dose is sufficiently low so as not to perturb the systemic drug concentrations achieved from the non-labelled oral dose). The intravenous and oral concentrations can then be deconvoluted by virtue of their different isotopic constitution, and can thus be used to determine the oral and intravenous pharmacokinetics from the same dose administration. This technique eliminates pharmacokinetic issues with non-equivalent clearance as well as enabling the intravenous dose to be administered with a minimum of toxicology and formulation. The technique was first applied using stable-isotopes such as 13C and mass-spectrometry to distinguish the isotopes by mass difference. More recently, 14C labelled drugs are administered intravenously and accelerator mass spectrometry (AMS) used to measure the isotopically labelled drug along with mass spectrometry for the unlabelled drug.

There is no regulatory requirement to define the intravenous pharmacokinetics or absolute bioavailability however regulatory authorities do sometimes ask for absolute bioavailability information of the extravascular route in cases in which the bioavailability is apparently low or variable and there is a proven relationship between the pharmacodynamics and the pharmacokinetics at therapeutic doses. In all such cases, to conduct an absolute bioavailability study requires that the drug be given intravenously.

Intravenous administration of a developmental drug can provide valuable information on the fundamental pharmacokinetic parameters of volume of distribution (V) and clearance (CL).

Relative bioavailability and bioequivalence 

In pharmacology, relative bioavailability measures the bioavailability (estimated as the AUC) of a formulation (A) of a certain drug when compared with another formulation (B) of the same drug, usually an established standard, or through administration via a different route. When the standard consists of intravenously administered drug, this is known as absolute bioavailability (see above).

 

Relative bioavailability is one of the measures used to assess bioequivalence (BE) between two drug products. For FDA approval, a generic manufacturer must demonstrate that the 90% confidence interval for the ratio of the mean responses (usually of AUC and the maximum concentration, Cmax) of its product to that of the "brand name drug" is within the limits of 80% to 125%. Where AUC refers to the concentration of the drug in the blood over time t = 0 to t = ∞, Cmax refers to the maximum concentration of the drug in the blood. When Tmax is given, it refers to the time it takes for a drug to reach Cmax.

While the mechanisms by which a formulation affects bioavailability and bioequivalence have been extensively studied in drugs, formulation factors that influence bioavailability and bioequivalence in nutritional supplements are largely unknown. As a result, in nutritional sciences, relative bioavailability or bioequivalence is the most common measure of bioavailability, comparing the bioavailability of one formulation of the same dietary ingredient to another.

Factors influencing bioavailability 

The absolute bioavailability of a drug, when administered by an extravascular route, is usually less than one (i.e., F< 100%). Various physiological factors reduce the availability of drugs prior to their entry into the systemic circulation. Whether a drug is taken with or without food will also affect absorption, other drugs taken concurrently may alter absorption and first-pass metabolism, intestinal motility alters the dissolution of the drug and may affect the degree of chemical degradation of the drug by intestinal microflora. Disease states affecting liver metabolism or gastrointestinal function will also have an effect.

Other factors may include, but are not limited to:
 Physical properties of the drug (hydrophobicity, pKa, solubility)
 The drug formulation (immediate release, excipients used, manufacturing methods, modified release – delayed release, extended release, sustained release, etc.)
 Whether the formulation is administered in a fed or fasted state
 Gastric emptying rate
 Circadian differences
 Interactions with other drugs/foods:
 Interactions with other drugs (e.g., antacids, alcohol, nicotine)
 Interactions with other foods (e.g., grapefruit juice, pomello, cranberry juice, brassica vegetables)
 Transporters: Substrate of efflux transporters (e.g. P-glycoprotein)
 Health of the gastrointestinal tract
 Enzyme induction/inhibition by other drugs/foods:
 Enzyme induction (increased rate of metabolism), e.g., Phenytoin induces CYP1A2, CYP2C9, CYP2C19, and CYP3A4
 Enzyme inhibition (decreased rate of metabolism), e.g., grapefruit juice inhibits CYP3A → higher nifedipine concentrations
 Individual variation in metabolic differences
 Age: In general, drugs are metabolized more slowly in fetal, neonatal, and geriatric populations
 Phenotypic differences, enterohepatic circulation, diet, gender
 Disease state
 E.g., hepatic insufficiency, poor renal function

Each of these factors may vary from patient to patient (inter-individual variation), and indeed in the same patient over time (intra-individual variation). In clinical trials, inter-individual variation is a critical measurement used to assess the bioavailability differences from patient to patient in order to ensure predictable dosing.

Bioavailability of drugs versus dietary supplements 

In comparison to drugs, there are significant differences in dietary supplements that impact the evaluation of their bioavailability. These differences include the following: the fact that nutritional supplements provide benefits that are variable and often qualitative in nature; the measurement of nutrient absorption lacks the precision; nutritional supplements are consumed for prevention and well-being; nutritional supplements do not exhibit characteristic dose-response curves; and dosing intervals of nutritional supplements, therefore, are not critical in contrast to drug therapy.

In addition, the lack of defined methodology and regulations surrounding the consumption of dietary supplements hinders the application of bioavailability measures in comparison to drugs. In clinical trials with dietary supplements, bioavailability primarily focuses on statistical descriptions of mean or average AUC differences between treatment groups, while often failing to compare or discuss their standard deviations or inter-individual variation. This failure leaves open the question of whether or not an individual in a group is likely to experience the benefits described by the mean-difference comparisons. Further, even if this issue were discussed, it would be difficult to communicate meaning of these inter-subject variances to consumers and/or their physicians.

Nutritional science: reliable and universal bioavailability 

One way to resolve this problem is to define "reliable bioavailability" as positive bioavailability results (an absorption meeting a predefined criterion) that include 84% of the trial subjects and "universal bioavailability" as those that include 98% of the trial subjects. This reliable-universal framework would improve communications with physicians and consumers such that, if it were included on products labels for example, make educated choices as to the benefits of a formulation for them directly. In addition, the reliable-universal framework is similar to the construction of confidence intervals, which statisticians have long offered as one potential solution for dealing with small samples, violations of statistical assumptions or large standard deviations.

See also 
 ADME-Tox
 Biopharmaceutics Classification System
 Caco-2
 Lipinski's Rule of 5

Notes

References

Sources

External links 
 Routes of Drug Administration
 Bioavailability of Drugs

Pharmacokinetic metrics
Medicinal chemistry
Life sciences industry